Bentall is a surname. Notable people with the surname include:

Barney Bentall (born 1956), Canadian pop/rock singer-songwriter
Edward Hammond Bentall (1814–1898), English manufacturer of ploughs and agricultural equipment, and politician
Frank Bentall, founder of the British department store chain Bentalls
Hugh Bentall (1920–2012), British surgeon who pioneered open-heart surgery
Richard Bentall (born 1956), British professor of clinical psychology
Ruby Bentall (born 1988), English actress